PI-PLC X domain-containing protein 1, also known as Phosphatidylinositol-specific phospholipase C, X domain containing 1, is an enzyme which in humans is encoded by the PLCXD1 gene. The gene coding for this protein is located in the pseudoautosomal region 1 (PAR1) of X and Y chromosomes.

References